Illig Qaghan, born Ashina Duobi, posthumous name Prince Huang of Guiyi (歸義荒王), was the last qaghan of the Eastern Turkic Khaganate.

Background 
He was a son of Yami Qaghan and his Tuyuhun wife Poshi (婆施). He was raised by the Tuyuhun general Külüg Tarkhan (胡祿達官). After coming of age, he was given the title Baghatur shad (莫賀咄設) and was assigned to rule the eastern parts of the empire.

Reign 
He declared himself Illig Khagan after the death of his older brother Chuluo and married his brother's  widow as well. He gave his nephew Ashina Shibobi the title of Tolis Qaghan afterwards and assigning him to his own former tribes. He continued his predecessors' pro-Sui politics, supporting puppet emperors.

Raids into Tang 
His first contacts with Tang were very hostile. In 621, Tujue forces attacked Fenyin and Xi territories, reaching as south as Yanmen in April. As a response, Turkic ambassadors were arrested in China and vice versa. In May, khagan's forces crushed Tang forces commanded by Li Shuliang (李叔良), Gaozu's cousin who died from arrow wounds after a month. They were repelled later by Yang Shidao.

Later raids were accompanied by Gao Kaidao and Yuan Junzhang (苑君璋), a general formerly under Liu Wuzhou. To stop raids, Gaozu offered khagan a tribute and a Chinese princess. Khagan accepted the proposal and both states released arrested envoys.

Soon raids restarted, in 623, khagan were assisted by Gao Kaidao and Liu Heita in sieging Mayi (present-day Shuozhou, Shanxi) and capturing it. Yuan Junzhang was appointed governor of Mayi. But Mayi was soon reverted by Tujue in hopes of attaining a marriage to Tang princess.

Later Liang Luoren (梁洛仁), the brother of Liang Shidu attacked with assistance from Eastern Tujue to Ling prefecture. However Li Daozong (a cousin of Taizong) was able to repel him, and further expel the khagan's nephew Ashina Yushe (阿史那郁射) from the Wuyuan (五原, in modern Yulin, Shaanxi).

As raids were becoming more frequent in 624, Li Shimin stepped up to accuse Ashina Shibobi of breaking his brotherhood vows, which made Illig Khagan to grow suspect towards Shibobi. Khagan soon attempted to seek peace, sending his nephew Ashina Shibobi and his uncle Ashina Simo to negotiate.

In 625, khagan attacked Ling Prefecture (靈州, roughly modern Yinchuan, Ningxia). Emperor Gaozu sent the general Zhang Jin (張瑾) to resist Tujue with Wen Yanbo serving as Zhang's secretary general.  When Zhang engaged khagan, however, he suffered a major defeat, and Wen was captured.  As Wen was an important official, khagan put him under interrogation and asked him about the strengths and weaknesses of the Tang state.  Wen refused to answer and khagan moved him to the Yin Mountains region.

In 626, just 19 days after Emperor Taizong took the throne, Shibobi and Illig were just across the Wei River from Chang'an. Emperor Taizong, accompanied by Gao Shilian and Fang Xuanling, was forced to meet Tujue across the river and personally negotiate peace terms, including tributes to Eastern Turks, before Illig withdrew.

Civil war 
In 627 he attempted to levy horses from the vassal Tiele tribes after all his livestock died from a snowstorm. The Tiele revolted under a Xueyantuo coalition. Emperor Taizong of Tang wasted no time in allying with these Tiele and the Khitans in a joint attack. Illig was already facing internal dissent from the Göktürk generals jealous of the influence of Illig's Sogdian viziers.

As response, khagan gave 100,000 cavalry to the command of Yukuk Shad to suppress revolts. However shad was defeated by Huige forces commanded by Pusa (菩薩) near Malie (near modern Gansu). Later, more generals of Tujue were defeated by the Xueyantuo.

In 628 Kumo Xi tribes also rose in rebellion against Tujue. Eastern governor Ashina Shibobi was unsuccessful in defeating rebels, which made khagan angry and ordered him to be flogged and imprisoned for 10 days. Taizong used this opportunity to invite him to flee to Tang.

End of reign 

In summer 628, when a number of Khitan tribes surrendered to Tang, Illig offered to trade Liang Shidu for the Khitan tribes, but Emperor Taizong refused stating Liang was already on verge of surrendering himself and Khitan were no Turk. Meanwhile, Emperor Taizong sent his brother-in-law Chai Shao (柴紹) and the generals Xue Wanjun (薛萬均), Liu Lancheng (劉蘭成), and Liu Min (Liang's former subordinate) to pressure Shuofang. They soon defeated Eastern Tujue forces and put Shuofang under siege, and Eastern Tujue forces were unable to lift the siege.  When the food supplies ran out, Liang Shidu's cousin Liang Luoren assassinated Liang Shidu and surrendered the city to Tang

Around the new year 630, with Eastern Tujue in internal turmoil, khagan attacked Ashina Shibobi (阿史那什鉢苾). As a reaction Emperor Taizong commissioned Li Jing, Li Shiji, Wei Xiaojie, Li Daozong, Chai Shao (柴紹), and Xue Wanche (薛萬徹) to attack Eastern Tujue, with Li Jing in overall command.  Li launched his attack in a surprise manner, from Mayi through Wuyang Range (惡陽嶺, in modern southern Hohhot, Inner Mongolia), capturing the important city of Dingxiang (定襄, in modern Hohhot).  In fear, khagan retreated to Qikou (磧口, in modern Xilin Gol League, Inner Mongolia).  Li Jing then sent secret messengers to persuade his associate to surrender.  One of them, Kangsumi (康蘇密), took Emperor Yang's wife Empress Xiao and their grandson Yang Zhengdao, whom Chuluo khagan had created the Prince of Sui, and surrendered to Li Jing. Khagan sent messengers to Emperor Taizong, offering to submit and to pay homage to him later, but was still considering fleeing further with his forces.  Emperor Taizong sent the official Tang Jian (唐儉) as an envoy to khagan, but also ordered Li Jing to escort khagan.  Li Jing, reading between the lines and believing that Emperor Taizong's order was to attack khagan, after joining forces with Li Shiji, launched the attack.  They defeated and captured most of khagan's remaining forces and killed his wife, Sui's Princess Yicheng. Khagan fled further, and was soon captured by his own men Ashina Sunishi (阿史那蘇尼失) and Ashina Nishu (阿史那泥孰) who handed him over to Li Daozong and Zhang Baoxiang (張寶相). He was brought back to Chang'an to face Taizong on 29 March, 630. After listing his crimes against the Tang, Taizong spared the former Qaghan.

Later years 
In his later years, former qaghan grew ill in morale. He was created a commander and appointed to be a governor of Guó Prefecture which was rich with deers 632 by Taizong, but he declined. He died in 634 and was created Prince of Guiyi (歸義王) and named Huang (荒) by Taizong posthumously. His teacher Kulug Tarkhan also reported to take his own life upon sadness. Cen Wenben was ordered to write memorial stone. His tomb is still not found.

Family 
He was married to Princess Yicheng of Sui (義成公主) and a number of wives. He had at least five issues:

 Ashina Dieluozhi (阿史那疊羅支) - he was captured by alongside his mother Li Jing in 630. Taizong reportedly told about him "filial respect for mother and father is same for every person be it Chinese or non-Chinese". He died single.
 Ashina Yukuk (阿史那欲谷) - he was ruling prince of Tiele tribes before 627, he would later go on to be khagan of Western Wing.
 Ashina Poluomen (阿史那婆羅門) - lived between 610 and 651. He was a general in Tang army. His tomb was found in October 2005, near Xi'an.
 Ashina Tegin (阿史那特勤) - yabgu of Eastern Tujue.
 Ashina Jian (阿史那暕, 629–671) - a Tang general, Commandant of the Left Guard.
 Ashina Gande (阿史那感徳) - a Prince of Guiyi (歸義王), lived between 664 and 691. Married to an Ashide woman.
 Etmish Beg - Ilterish Qaghan, founder of Second Turkic Kaghanate was a descendant of Illig through Etmish beg. Some scholars such as Vladimir Sychev suggest he was same person with Ashina Nishufu.

References

Sources 

Lev Gumilev. The Gokturks. Moscow, 1967.

See also 
 Emperor Taizong's campaign against Eastern Tujue

Göktürk khagans
634 deaths
Year of birth unknown
Ashina house of the Turkic Empire
7th-century Turkic people
Monarchs taken prisoner in wartime